Romoney Crichlow-Noble (commonly known as Romoney Crichlow) (born 3 June 1999) is an English professional footballer who plays as a defender for Bradford City on loan from Huddersfield Town.

Career
Born in Luton, Crichlow-Noble started out at Enfield Borough whilst studying at the Dynamic Football Academy. He moved to Huddersfield Town in 2017. He moved on loan to Bradford (Park Avenue), Hartlepool United and Welling United in 2019 and 2020.

In July 2020, he signed a new one-year deal. Crichlow made his senior debut for Huddersfield on 5 September 2020, when he played in their EFL Cup defeat against Rochdale. He scored his first goal for the club on 9 January 2021 in a 3–2 FA Cup defeat to Plymouth Argyle.

Swindon Town loan
On 6 August 2021, Crichlow joined  side Swindon Town on a season-long loan He was recalled by Huddersfield on 13 January 2022.

Plymouth Argyle loan
On the same day he was recalled from Swindon, he was sent on loan to EFL League One side Plymouth Argyle for the remainder of the season.

Bradford City loan
On 21 June 2022, Crichlow joined EFL League Two side Bradford City on a season long loan.

Personal life
His mother, Natalie Crichlow, died on 6 August 2019 in Barbados having been attacked. He thanked Hartlepool United fans for their support following his mother's death.

References

1999 births
Living people
English people of Barbadian descent
Footballers from Luton
English footballers
Association football defenders
English Football League players
National League (English football) players
Huddersfield Town A.F.C. players
Bradford (Park Avenue) A.F.C. players
Hartlepool United F.C. players
Welling United F.C. players
Swindon Town F.C. players
Plymouth Argyle F.C. players
Bradford City A.F.C. players
Black British sportspeople